The Queensland derby refers to rugby league matches between National Rugby League (NRL) clubs, the Brisbane Broncos and North Queensland Cowboys, first contested in 1995. The rivalry features the two longest-serving Queensland based clubs in the ARL/Super League/NRL competitions. They have met 53 times since 1995, with Brisbane leading the head-to-head series 35–18; with two drawn matches.

The derby is also known as the XXXX Derby, due to sponsorship from Castlemaine XXXX.

In 2015, the clubs played in the first all-Queensland grand final, with North Queensland defeating Brisbane 17–16 in golden point extra time to win their first premiership.

History

Early Years
The Brisbane Broncos entered the New South Wales Rugby League premiership in 1988 alongside fellow Queensland club, the Gold Coast Giants. Under the coaching of Wayne Bennett and led by such players as Allan Langer, Kevin Walters, Glenn Lazarus and Steve Renouf, the Broncos established themselves as Queensland's premier rugby league club in the early 1990s. By the time the North Queensland Cowboys, based in the north Queensland city of Townsville, entered the competition in 1995, the Brisbane side were already two-time premiership winners and perennial finalists.

The first meeting between the two teams occurred in Round 5 of the 1995 ARL season, when North Queensland hosted Brisbane at the Stockland Stadium. The Cowboys, who went into the game in last place, kept the scores level at 4–all at halftime, before star halfback Allan Langer set up three tries and scored one himself to give the Broncos a 20–12 victory. Over the next nine seasons, Brisbane maintained a stranglehold over the fixture, winning 13 of the 15 games played. The lone bright spot for North Queensland were two drawn games in Round 11 1997 and Round 8 1999 (both 20–all). Despite the regular losses, the game was a highlight in the season for North Queensland, regularly drawing crowds of 20,000+ in Townsville.

2004–2010
It would not be until 2004 that the North Queensland side would become a serious threat to the Brisbane Broncos, when the club finished in the top eight for the first time and qualified for their first finals series. North Queensland won their Week 1 finals match, while the Broncos lost theirs, meaning North Queensland would play as the "home" team when the two sides would meet at Sydney's Aussie Stadium a week later. At the behest of both clubs, and in accordance with Aussie Stadium management, the NRL agreed to move the game to Townsville's Dairy Farmers Stadium. North Queensland won the game 10–0, giving them their first ever win over the Broncos and eliminating from the finals in the process. The game was Brisbane captain and club legend Gorden Tallis' last, who incidentally was born and raised in Townsville.

The following season, Brisbane would regain control of the derby, winning both games in 2005. That season the Cowboys qualified for their first Grand Final, losing to the Wests Tigers. Between March 2006 and March 2007, North Queensland defeated Brisbane three straight times, including a 36–4 win in Round 1 2006, their biggest victory over Brisbane. Despite North Queensland's success in the derby, Brisbane would go on to win the 2006 NRL Grand Final and record their sixth premiership victory. From July 2007 to 2010, Brisbane would again dominant the derby, winning seven straight games.

2011–2019
North Queensland marked their resurgence as a finals contender in Round 1 of the 2011 NRL season with a victory over Brisbane, their first win over Brisbane in four years. In Round 23 2011, the Broncos won the derby fixture 34–16, in Darren Lockyer's record-breaking 350th NRL game.

In 2012, North Queensland defeated Brisbane three times, a first for either club. In Round 2, they won 28–26 in Brisbane, thanks to a late Matthew Bowen try. In Round 15, they kept Brisbane scoreless in a 12–0 victory in Townsville and on 18 September, the two sides met in the finals for the second time, with the Cowboys eliminating the Brisbane club with a 33–16 win. Cowboys' halfback Michael Morgan scored a hat trick, becoming the first halfback to do so in a finals game. The game was also the last for Brisbane club legend Petero Civoniceva, who retired after 309 NRL games.

The Brisbane side defeated North Queensland in both encounters in 2013 and in Round 2 of the 2014 season recording their longest winning streak in the Queensland derby since 2010. In 2014, the two sides met for the first time outside of the NRL competition, or pre-season trials, in the final of the inaugural Auckland Nines competition. North Queensland triumphed 16–7 to win their first major trophy.

In 2015, the two sides played each other four times, with both clubs coming away with two wins. After splitting the series in the regular season, the clubs met in the finals series for the third time. The Brisbane side prevailed at home, 16–12, in what was called one of the season's best games. Three weeks later the rivals met again in the 2015 NRL Grand Final, the first in history to feature two Queensland-based clubs. North Queensland won the game 17–16 in golden point extra time, with Johnathan Thurston kicking the winning field goal. The loss was the Broncos first in a Grand Final, having won on their six previous attempts.

The match, particularly due to its dramatic ending, was quickly hailed as one of the greatest Grand Finals in rugby league history, drawing comparisons with the 1989 NSWRL Grand Final and the 1997 ARL Grand Final.

2020–present
In Round 1 of the 2020 NRL season, the sides faced each other in the first NRL match to be played at the new North Queensland Stadium. Brisbane won the match 28–21 in front of a crowd of 22,459.

In the final round of the 2020 NRL season, Brisbane who were running last had the opportunity to avoid their first ever wooden spoon if they could defeat North Queensland who were sitting in 14th position.  North Queensland would go on to defeat Brisbane 32-16 at Suncorp Stadium and condemn Brisbane to the wooden spoon.

All-time results

Head to Head

This table only includes competitive matches, excluding all pre-season and exhibitions matches

Regular season
This table only shows competitive regular season matches, and not pre-season or exhibition matches.

Finals series
This table only shows competitive finals series matches.

NRL Nines
Playing in the NRL Nines does not count as a senior first grade appearance.

Statistics

Most appearances

Top pointscorers

Most points in a single game:
For Brisbane: 18
 Darren Lockyer (9 goals), Brisbane 58 – 4 North Queensland, Round 5, 1998
 Ben Walker (1 try, 7 goals), Brisbane 50 – 8 North Queensland, Round 6, 2000
 Michael De Vere (9 goals), Brisbane 50 – 6 North Queensland, Round 14, 2001
For North Queensland: 24
Johnathan Thurston (3 tries, 6 goals), North Queensland 36 – 4 Brisbane, Round 1, 2006

Top tryscorers

Most tries in a single game:
For Brisbane: 3
 Steve Renouf (3 tries), Brisbane 58 – 14 North Queensland, Round 5, 1996
 Allan Langer (3 tries), Brisbane 58 – 4 North Queensland, Round 5, 1998
 Lote Tuqiri (3 tries), Brisbane 50 – 8 North Queensland, Round 6, 2000
 Shaun Berrigan (3 tries), Brisbane 38 – 12 North Queensland, Round 9, 2003
 Josh Hoffman (3 tries), Brisbane 34 – 16 North Queensland, Round 23, 2011
For North Queensland: 3
Johnathan Thurston (3 tries), North Queensland 36 – 4 Brisbane, Round 1, 2006
Matt Sing (3 tries), North Queensland 26 – 10 Brisbane, Round 20, 2006
Michael Morgan (3 tries), North Queensland 33 – 16 Brisbane, Finals Week 1, 2012
Michael Morgan (3 tries), North Queensland 31 – 20 Brisbane, Round 10, 2015
Kyle Feldt (3 tries), North Queensland 32 – 16 Brisbane, Round 20, 2020
Jeremiah Nanai (3 tries), North Queensland 38 – 12 Brisbane, Round 3, 2022

Attendances
Highest attendance:
Brisbane Broncos at home: 50,612 – Brisbane 36 – 2 North Queensland, Round 3, 2008, Suncorp Stadium
North Queensland at home: 30,302 – North Queensland 20 – 20 Brisbane Broncos, Round 8, 1999, Dairy Farmers Stadium
Lowest attendance:
Brisbane Broncos at home: 10,215 – Brisbane 52 – 8 North Queensland, Round 14, 2002, ANZ Stadium (Brisbane)
North Queensland at home: 17,530 – North Queensland 14 – 18 Brisbane, Round 21, 2019, 1300SMILES Stadium
Neutral venue:
82,758 – Brisbane 16 – 17 North Queensland, 2015 NRL Grand Final, ANZ Stadium (Sydney)

Shared player history
When the Cowboys entered the competition in 1995, they had three former Broncos (Jason Erba, Willie Morganson and Paul Morris) in their inaugural squad, with Morganson being the first player to play for both clubs. Cowboys' junior Scott Prince was the first player to play for both clubs in the Queensland derby. Ben Hannant is the first and, so far, only player to win premierships with both clubs (Brisbane in 2006 and North Queensland in 2015). Tariq Sims and Will Tupou both played NYC for the Broncos and later moved to the Cowboys, where they played first grade.

See also

Rivalries in the National Rugby League

References

External links

Rugby league rivalries
Brisbane Broncos
North Queensland Cowboys matches
Rugby league in Brisbane
Sports rivalries in Australia
Rugby league in Queensland